Bang Lamung station is a railway station located in Bang Lamung Subdistrict, Bang Lamung District, Chon Buri. It opened in July 1989 as part of the Eastern Line Chachoengsao Junction–Sattahip Port section. Nearby is the Ban Rong Po Gas Refinery, owned by PTT.

Train services 
 Ordinary train No. 283/284 Bangkok–Ban Phlu Ta Luang–Bangkok

References 
 
 
 

Railway stations in Thailand
1989 establishments in Thailand
Railway stations opened in 1989